A firewalk is an act of walking barefoot over a bed of hot embers or stones.

Firewalk may also refer to:

 Firewalk (computing), a technique to analyze IP packets
FIREWALK, a U.S. NSA ANT catalog capabability

See also
Fire Walk with Us!, an album by Aborym
 Firewalker (disambiguation)